Unitax ("unified national indirect taxation") is a system of national revenue (complemented by ulitax - "unified local indirect taxation") based on non-monetary, energy value, units of assessment. Thus a revenue of £x or $y per gigajoule of primary energy entering any given economy can phase out all other taxes and raise revenue which is continuously, automatically and with hardly any paperwork, geared to standard of living, income and property. Essential safeguards are outlined in the "Resource Economics Proposition".

See also
James Robertson
Henry George

Notes

External links
International Single Tax Association
[ "Basic Income and the Advanced Economy"]
[ "Sustainable Taxation"]

Tax reform